Mary Lily Kenan Flagler Bingham (1867-1917) was an American philanthropist and heiress who became notorious when she married one of the richest men of the Gilded Age. Mary Lily outlived her first husband, Henry Flagler and inherited his huge fortune, married again three years later, and died under suspicious circumstances at aged fifty. She left the millions she inherited to members of her family and to the University of North Carolina at Chapel Hill.

Childhood 
Before she became famous and extraordinarily wealthy, Mary Lily grew up in an affluent household. She was the daughter of William Rand Kenan Sr and Mary Hargrave Kenan, Mary Lily was born in Duplin County, on June 14, 1867.  When she was little, her father was a life insurance agent. By the late 1870s, her family lived in Wilmington, North Carolina  Mary Lily attended Amy Bradley’s Tileston school in Wilmington. Mary Lily was well-educated for a woman in the late 19th century: she both attended school in Wilmington, and attended Peace College in Raleigh.  Kenan was also well known for her musical abilities and according to one account, she was North Carolina’s “reigning belle” because of her vivaciousness, beauty, and accomplishments. By this time, Mary Lily had become well acquainted with some of the richest members of Wilmington society.  She traveled with the Mr. and Mrs. Pembroke Jones and became socially intimate with the Jones’ friend, Henry Walters, as well as Mr. and Mrs. Henry Flagler.

Marriages 
Mary Lily Kenan married the much-older Henry Morrison Flagler in 1901. She was his third wife. Henry Morrison Flagler was 72 years old. She was 34, but it wasn’t only the age gap that scandalized the nation. In order to marry Mary Lily, Henry Morrison Flagler had to obtain a divorce from his second wife, who had become mentally ill over the course of their marriage. In order to obtain a divorce, he changed his legal residence to Florida, and persuaded the Florida legislature to allow divorce on the grounds of insanity. He was criticized for this action. According to the Goldsboro Argus  “A Man who would thus cast off an aged wife, blameless herself, is simply beyond execration.”

When the couple married in 1901 in Duplin County, Flagler gave Mary Lily Kenan “…a check for $1,000,000, and $3,000,000 in bonds as a wedding present.” After their marriage, Henry lavished gifts and attention on Mary Lily. Henry built Whitehall, a “….75-room, 100,000-square-foot Gilded Age mansion…as a wedding present for his wife, Mary Lily Kenan Flagler. The couple used the home as a winter retreat from 1902 until Flagler's death in 1913, establishing the Palm Beach season for the wealthy of the Gilded Age.”

Henry Flagler died in 1913, and passed the majority of his wealth on to Mary Lily. Three years later, Mary Lily married a college friend of her brother’s, who she’d dated before in the 1890s. She and Judge Robert Worth Bingham married in New York City, at the home of Mr. and Mrs. Pembroke Jones in 1916. This second marriage did not last long. Mary Lily Kenan Flagler Bingham died in July 1917.

Death 

Mary Lily Kenan Bingham’s death also sparked scandal and controversy.  Mary Lily died after a short illness, and, according to the Wilmington Morning Star, “…the news of her death produced a profound shock in the family and among many friends in the city and in other cities of the State…” Mary Lily was buried on July 31, 1917, after a service in the residence of Mary Lily’s sister Sarah.  The shock of Mary Lily’s death seems to have quickly turned to suspicion about how she died. Headlines spoke of a “tragic mystery,” “foul play” and “murder” and seemed to imply that Mary Lily’s husband may have had something to do with her death. Before they married, Judge Bingham waived his rights to the Flagler fortune and most of the estate was left to Mary Lily’s birth family members. Judge Bingham did receive $5 million, and some of the concerns about him seems to have stemmed from this inheritance, which was a late addition to Mary Lily’s will.

So rather than remaining at rest in Oakdale Cemetery, Mary Lily Kenan Flagler Bingham’s body was exhumed in September 1917, with armed guards stationed around the gravesite as her body was dug up in the night. The autopsy was requested by Graham Kenan, Mary Lily’s sister Sarah’s husband, not Robert Bingham. Despite these irregularities and mysterious circumstances, no charges were ever levied against anyone in the matter of Mrs. Bingham’s death.  Bingham went on to be an ambassador to England in the 1930s, and parlayed Mary Lily’s money into a newspaper empire. The results of the autopsy were never released. Rumors of drug use, alcoholism, and murder have swirled around the life of Mary Lily Kenan Flagler Bingham ever since.

The estate left was vast – “…estimated to be worth all the way from $65,000,000 to $130,000,000.”

Legacy 
Mary Lily’s marriage to Henry Flagler helped make her entire family extremely wealthy.  William R. Kenan Jr. and her sisters Jessie Kenan Wise and Sarah Graham Kenan and niece Louise Wise, were all recipients of her will’s largess.  So was the University of North Carolina at Chapel Hill.  While Mary Lily Kenan attended Peace College at a time when women were not admitted to the University of North Carolina, one of her greatest legacies is the Kenan Professorship Fund, to which she donated $1.875 million dollars in honor of her male family members who attended the college. Mary Lily’s legacy of giving to UNC was enhanced by the actions of her brother William and her sister Sarah, who both donated generously to UNC after they inherited millions from their sister.

References 

American women philanthropists
Burials at Oakdale Cemetery
Mary
Philanthropists from North Carolina
University of North Carolina
William Peace University alumni
Flagler family